William Fownes may refer to:
William C. Fownes Jr. (1877–1950), American golfer
Sir William Fownes, 1st Baronet (died 1735), MP for Wicklow Borough
Sir William Fownes, 2nd Baronet (1709–1778), MP for Dingle, Knocktopher and Wicklow Borough

See also
Fownes (surname)